Qinghai  (alternately romanized as Tsinghai, Ch'inghai), also known as Kokonor, is a landlocked province in the northwest of the People's Republic of China. It is the fourth largest province of China by area and has the third smallest population. Its capital and largest city is Xining.

Qinghai borders Gansu on the northeast, Xinjiang on the northwest, Sichuan on the southeast and the Tibet Autonomous Region on the southwest. Qinghai province was established in 1928 during the period of the Republic of China, and until 1949 was ruled by Chinese Muslim warlords known as the Ma clique. The Chinese name "Qinghai" is after Qinghai Lake, the largest lake in China. The lake is known as Tso ngon in Tibetan, and as Kokonor Lake in English, derived from the Mongol Oirat name for Qinghai Lake. Both Tso ngon and Kokonor are names found in historic documents to describe the region.

Located mostly on the Tibetan Plateau, the province are inhabited by a number of peoples including the Tibetans, Mongols, Han (concentrated in the provincial capital of Xining and nearby Haidong), Hui, Monguors, and Salars. According to 2021 census reports, Tibetans constitute a fifth of the population of Qinghai and the Hui compose roughly a sixth of the population. There are over 37 recognized ethnic groups among Qinghai's population of 5.6 million, with national minorities making up a total of 45.5% of the population.

The area of Qinghai was controlled by Manchu-led Qing China around 1724, after their defeat of Khoshut Mongols which controlled most of the area that is now Qinghai. After the internal overthrow of the Qing dynasty in 1912, Qinghai came under Chinese Muslim warlord Ma Qi's control until the Northern Expedition by the Republic of China consolidated central control in 1928. In the same year, the province of Qinghai was established by the Nationalist Government, with Xining as its capital.

History
During the Bronze Age, Qinghai was home to a diverse group of nomadic tribes closely related to other Central Asians who traditionally made a living in agriculture and husbandry, the Kayue culture. The eastern part of the area of Qinghai was under the control of the Han dynasty about 2,000 years ago. It was a battleground during the Tang and subsequent Central Plain dynasties when they fought against successive Tibetan tribes.

In the middle of 3rd century CE, nomadic people related to the Mongolic Xianbei migrated to pasture lands around the Qinghai Lake (Koko Nur) and established the Tuyuhun Kingdom.

In the 7th century, the Tuyuhun Kingdom was attacked by both the Tibetan Empire and the Tang dynasty as both sought control over the Silk Road trade routes. Tibetan King Songsten Gampo was victorious, and settled the area around Tso ngon (Lake Go, or Kokonor Lake). Military conflicts had severely weakened the Tuyuhun kingdom and it was incorporated into the Tibetan Empire. The Tibetan Empire continued expanding beyond Tso ngon during Trisong Detsen's and Ralpacan's reigns, and the empire controlled vast areas north and east of Tso ngon until 848, which included Xi'an.

After the disintegration of the Tibetan Empire, small local factions emerged, some under the titular authority of Central Plain polities. The Song dynasty defeated the Kokonor Kingdom in the 1070s. During the Mongol-led Yuan dynasty's administrative rule of Tibet, the region comprised the headwaters of the Ma chu (Machu River, Yellow River) and the Yalong (Yangtze) rivers and was known as Amdo, but apportioned to different administrative divisions than Tibet proper.

Most of Qinghai was once also a short time under the control of early Ming dynasty, but later gradually lost to the Khoshut Khanate founded by the Oirats. The Xunhua Salar Autonomous County is where most Salar people live in Qinghai. The Salars migrated to Qinghai from Samarkand in 1370. The chief of the four upper clans around this time was Han Pao-yuan and Ming granted him office of centurion, it was at this time the people of his four clans took Han as their surname. The other chief Han Shan-pa of the four lower Salar clans got the same office from Ming, and his clans were the ones who took Ma as their surname.

From 1640 to 1724, a big part of the area that is now Qinghai was under Khoshut Mongol control, but in 1724 it was conquered by the armies of the Qing dynasty. Xining, the capital of modern Qinghai province, began to function as the administrative center, although the city itself was then part of Gansu province within the "Tibetan frontier district". In 1724, 13-Article for the Effective Governing of Qinghai (Chinese:青海善后事宜十三条) was proposed by Nian Gengyao and adopted by the Central Government to gain full control of Qinghai.

During the rule of the Qing dynasty, the governor was a viceroy of the Qing Emperor, but the local ethnic groups enjoyed much autonomy. Many chiefs retained their traditional authority, participating in local administrations. The Dungan revolt (1862–77) devastated the Hui Muslim population of Shaanxi, shifting the Hui center of population to Gansu and Qinghai. Another Dungan revolt broke out in Qinghai in 1895 when various Muslim ethnic groups in Qinghai and Gansu rebelled against the Qing. Following the overthrow of the Qing dynasty in 1911, the region came under Chinese Muslim warlord Ma Qi control until the Northern Expedition by the Republic of China consolidated central control in 1928.

In July–August 1912, General Ma Fuxiang was "Acting Chief Executive Officer of Kokonur" (de facto Governor of the region that later became Qinghai). In 1928, Qinghai province was created. The Muslim warlord and General Ma Qi became military governor of Qinghai, followed by his brother Ma Lin (warlord) and then Ma Qi's son Ma Bufang. In 1932 Tibet invaded Qinghai, attempting to capture southern parts of Qinghai province, following contention in Yushu, Qinghai, over a monastery in 1932. The army of Ma Bufang defeated the Tibetan armies. Governor of Qinghai Ma Bufang was described as a socialist by American journalist John Roderick and friendly compared to the other Ma Clique warlords. Ma Bufang was reported to be good humoured and jovial in contrast to the brutal reign of Ma Hongkui. Most of eastern China was ravaged by the Second Sino-Japanese War and the Chinese Civil War, by contrast, Qinghai was relatively untouched.

Ma Bufang increased the prominence of the Hui and Salar people in Qinghai's politics by heavily recruiting to his army from the counties in which those ethnic groups predominated. General Ma started a state run and controlled industrialization project, directly creating educational, medical, agricultural, and sanitation projects, run or assisted by the state. The state provided money for food and uniforms in all schools, state run or private. Roads and a theater were constructed. The state controlled all the press, no freedom was allowed for independent journalists.

As the 1949 Chinese revolution approached Qinghai, Ma Bufang abandoned his post and flew to Hong Kong, traveling abroad but never returning to China. On January 1, 1950, the Qinghai Province People's Government was declared, owing its allegiance to the new People's Republic of China. Aside from some minor adjustments to suit the geography, the PRC maintained the province's territorial integrity. Resistance to Communist rule continued in the form of the Huis' Kuomintang Islamic insurgency (1950–58), spreading past traditionally Hui areas to the ethnic-Tibetan south. Although the Hui composed 15.6% of Qinghai's population in 1949, making the province the second-largest concentration of Hui after Ningxia, the state denied the Hui ethnic autonomous townships and counties that their numbers warranted under Chinese law until the 1980s.

Geography
Qinghai is located on the northeastern part of the Tibetan Plateau. By area, it is the largest province in the People's Republic of China (excluding the autonomous regions).

The Yellow River originates in the southern part of the province, while the Yangtze and Mekong have their sources in the southwestern part. Qinghai is separated by the Riyue Mountain into pastoral and agricultural zones in the west and east.

The Sanjiangyuan National Nature Reserve is located in Qinghai and contains the headwaters of the Yellow River, Yangtze River, and Mekong River. The reserve was established to protect the headwaters of these three rivers and consists of 18 subareas, each containing three zones which are managed with differing degrees of strictness.

Qinghai Lake is the largest salt water lake in China, and the second largest in the world. Other large lakes are Lake Hala in the Qilian mountains, lakes Gyaring and Ngoring in the headwater region of the Yellow River, Lake Donggi Cona, and many saline and salt lakes in the western part of the province. 

The Qaidam basin lies in the northwest part of the province at an altitude between 3000 and 5000 meters above sea level. About a third of this resource rich basin is desert.

Climate

Due to the high altitude, Qinghai has quite cold winters (harsh in the highest elevations), mild summers, and a large diurnal temperature variation. It is also prone to heavy winds as well as sandstorms from February to April. Significant rainfall occurs mainly in summer, while precipitation is very low in winter and spring, and is generally low enough to keep much of the province semi-arid or arid.

Politics

The Politics of Qinghai Province in the People's Republic of China are structured in a dual party-government system like all other governing institutions in mainland China.

The Governor of Qinghai (青海省省长) is the highest-ranking official in the People's Government of Qinghai. However, in the province's dual party-government governing system, the Governor has less power than the Qinghai Chinese Communist Party (CCP) Provincial Committee Secretary (青海省委书记), colloquially termed the "Qinghai Party Chief".

Administrative divisions

Because the Han form Qinghai's ethnic majority and because none of its many ethnic minorities have clear dominance over the rest, the province is not administered as an autonomous region. Instead, the province has many ethnic autonomous areas at the district and county levels. Qinghai is administratively divided into eight prefecture-level divisions: two prefecture-level cities and six autonomous prefectures:

The eight prefecture-level divisions of Qinghai are subdivided into 44 county-level divisions (6 districts, 4 county-level cities, 27 counties and 7 autonomous counties).

Urban areas

Population

Demographics

Ethnicity
There are over 37 recognized ethnic groups among Qinghai's population of 5.2 million, with national minorities making up 45.5% of the population. The Han population stand at 54.5% of the total population, Tibetan 20.7%, Hui 16%, Tu (Monguor) 4%, with also some groups of Mongol, and Salar, all of those groups being the most populous in the province. Han Chinese predominate in the cities of Xining, Haidong, Delingha and Golmud, and elsewhere in the northeast. The Hui are concentrated in Xining, Haidong, Minhe County, Hualong County, and Datong County. The Tu people predominate in Huzhu County and the Salars in Xunhua County; Tibetans and Mongols are sparsely distributed across the rural western part of the province.

Of the Muslim ethnic groups in China, Qinghai has communities of Hui, Salar, Dongxiang, and Bao'an. The Hui dominate the wholesale business in Qinghai.

Religion

The predominant religions in Qinghai are Chinese folk religions (including Taoist traditions and Confucianism) and Chinese Buddhism among the Han Chinese. The large Tibetan population practices Tibetan schools of Buddhism or traditional Tibetan Bön religion, while the Hui Chinese practice Islam. Christianity is the religion of 0.76% of the province's population according to the Chinese General Social Survey of 2004. According to a survey of 2010, 17.51% of the population of Qinghai follow Islam.

From September 1848, the city was the seat of a short-lived Latin Catholic Apostolic Vicariate (pre-diocesan missionary jurisdiction) of Kokonur (alias Khouhkou-noor, Kokonoor), but it was suppressed in 1861. No incumbent(s) recorded.

Culture
Qinghai has been influenced by the interactions "between Mongol and Tibetan culture, north to south, and Han Chinese and Inner Asia Muslim culture, east to west". The languages of Qinghai have for centuries formed a Sprachbund, with Zhongyuan Mandarin, Amdo Tibetan, Salar, Yugur, and Monguor borrowing from and influencing one another. In mainstream Chinese culture, Qinghai is most associated with the Tale of King Mu, Son of Heaven. According to this legend, King Mu of Zhou (r. 976–922 BCE) pursued hostile Quanrong nomads to eastern Qinghai, where the goddess Xi Wangmu threw the king a banquet in the Kunlun Mountains.

The main religions in Qinghai are Tibetan Buddhism, Islam and Chinese Folk Religions. The Dongguan Mosque has been continuously operating since 1380. Measures of education in Qinghai are low, particularly among the ethnic minorities. The yak, which is native to Qinghai, is widely used in the province for transportation and its meat. The Mongols of Qinghai celebrate the Naadam festival on the Qaidam Basin every year.

Economy

Qinghai's economy is amongst the smallest in all of China. Its nominal GDP for 2011 was just 163.4 billion RMB (US$25.9 billion) and contributes to about 0.35% of the entire country's economy. Per capita GDP was 19,407 RMB (US$2,841), the second lowest in China.

Its heavy industry includes iron and steel production, located near its capital city of Xining. Oil and natural gas from the Qaidam Basin have also been an important contributor to the economy. Salt works operate at many of the province's numerous salt lakes.

Outside of the provincial capital, Xining, most of Qinghai remains underdeveloped. Qinghai ranks second lowest in China in terms of highway length, and will require a significant expansion of its infrastructure to capitalize on the economic potential of its rich natural resources.

Economic and technological development zone

Xining Economic & Technological Development Zone (XETDZ) was approved as state-level development zone in July 2000. XETDZ lies in the east of Xining,  from downtown. In the east of the province, Xining stands at the upper reaches of the Huangshui River—one of the Yellow River's branches. The city is surrounded by the mountains with an average elevation of 2261 meters and the highest at 4393 meters. XETDZ is the first of its kind at the national level on the Qinghai-Tibet Plateau. It is established to fulfill the nation's strategy of developing the west.

XETDZ enjoys a convenient transportation system, connected by the Xining-Lanzhou expressway and running through by two main roads, the broadest in the city. It is 4 kilometers from the railway station, 15 kilometers from Xi'ning Airport — a grade 4D airport with 14 airlines to cities such as Beijing, Guangzhou, Shanghai, Chengdu and Xi'an. Xining is Qinghai province's passage to the outside world, a transportation center with more than ten highways, over 100 roads and two railways, Lanzhou-Qinghai and Qinghai-Tibet Railways in and out of the city.

It focuses on the development of following industries: chemicals based on salt lake resources, nonferrous metals, and petroleum and natural gas processing; special medicine, foods and bio-chemicals using local plateau animals and plants; new products involving ecological and environmental protection, high technology, new materials as well as information technology; and services such as logistics, banking, real estate, tourism, hotel, catering, agency and international trade.

Tourism

Many tourist attractions center on Xining, the provincial seat of Qinghai.

During the hot summer months, many tourists from the hot southern and eastern parts of China travel to Xining, as the climate of Xining in July and August is quite mild and comfortable, making the city an ideal summer retreat.

Qinghai Lake is another tourist attraction, albeit further from Xining than Kumbum Monastery (Ta'er Si). The lake is the largest saltwater lake in China, and is also located on the "Roof of the World", the Tibetan Plateau. The lake itself lies at 3,600m elevation. The surrounding area is made up of rolling grasslands and populated by ethnic Tibetans. Most pre-arranged tours stop at Bird Island. An international bicycle race takes place annually from Xining to Qinghai Lake.

Transportation

The Lanqing Railway, running between Lanzhou, Gansu and Xining, the province's capital, was completed in 1959 and is the major transportation route in and out of the province. A continuation of the line, the Qinghai-Tibet Railway via Golmud and western Qinghai, has become one of the most ambitious projects in PRC history. It was completed in October 2005 and now links Tibet with the rest of China through Qinghai.

Construction on the Golmud–Dunhuang Railway, in the province's northwestern part, started in 2012.

Six National Highways run through the province.

Xining Caojiabao International Airport provides service to Beijing, Lanzhou, Golmud and Delingha. Smaller regional airports, Delingha Airport, Golog Maqin Airport, Huatugou Airport, Qilian Airport and Yushu Batang Airport, serve some of the local centers of the far-flung province; plans exist for the construction of three more by 2020.

Telecommunications

Since the Ministry of Industry and Information Technology began its "Access to Telephones Project", Qinghai has invested 640 million yuan to provide telephone access to 3860 out its 4133 administrative villages. At the end of 2006, 299 towns had received Internet access. However, 6.6 percent of villages in the region still have no access to the telephone. These villages are mainly scattered in Qingnan Area, with 90 percent of them located in Yushu and Guoluo. The average altitude of these areas exceeds 3600 meters, and the poor natural conditions hamper the establishment of telecommunication facilities in the region.

Satellite phones have been provided to 186 remote villages in Qinghai Province as of September 14, 2007. The areas benefited were Yushu Tibetan Autonomous Prefecture and Guoluo Tibetan Autonomous Prefecture. Qinghai has recently been provided with satellite telephone access. In June 2007, China Satcom carried out an in-depth survey in Yushu and Guoluo, and made a special satellite phones for these areas. Two phones were provided to each village for free, and calls were charged at the rate of 0.2 yuan (about a quarter of a US cent at that time) per minute for both local and national calls, with the extra charges assumed by China Satcom. No monthly rent was charged on the satellite phone. International calls were also available.

Colleges and universities

 Qinghai University
 Qinghai Normal University
 Qinghai University for Nationalities
 Qinghai Medical College
 Qinghai Radio & Television University

See also
 2010 Yushu earthquake
 Amdo
 Geladandong
 Haplogroup D-M15 (Y-DNA)
 Haplogroup O3 (Y-DNA)
 Iris qinghainica (native plant of Qinghai)
 Major national historical and cultural sites in Qinghai
 Tectonic summary of Qinghai

References

Citations

General sources 

 Economic profile for Qinghai at HKTDC

External links

 
 Memorials from Qinghai from the 19th century.

 
1928 establishments in China
Amdo
Inner Asia
Provinces of the People's Republic of China
States and territories established in 1928
Tibetan Plateau
Western China